El Caney (also Caney) is a small village six kilometers (four miles) to the northeast of Santiago, Cuba. "Caney" means longhouse in Taíno.

Overview
It was known in centuries past as the site where Hernán Cortés received a vision supposedly ordering him to Christianize Mexico. The settlement was host to the Battle of El Caney on 1 July 1898.

Notable people
Manuel Fernández (1871–1921), Spanish general
Lorenzo Hierrezuelo (1907– 1993), Cuban trova musician

See also 
 San Juan Hill
 Siboney
 Daiquirí
 El Cobre

References

Populated places in Santiago de Cuba Province
Santiago de Cuba